Dou Xiankang (born 23 January 1966) is a Chinese space physicist, university administrator and politician, formerly served as president of Wuhan University. 

Dou joined the Chinese Communist Party (CCP) in October 1985. He is a delegate to the 13th National People's Congress. He is a representative of the 20th National Congress of the Chinese Communist Party and an alternate member of the 20th Central Committee of the Chinese Communist Party. He was a member of the 11th National Committee of the Chinese People's Political Consultative Conference.

Biography
Dou was born in Si County, Anhui, on 23 January 1966. He attended Si County No. 1 High School. He received his master's degree and doctor's degree from the University of Science and Technology of China in 1987 and 1988, respectively. After a short time studying French at the Shanghai International Studies University, he pursued advanced studies in the France, earning his master's degree in 1990 and doctor's degree in 1993 at Paris Diderot University. He carried out postdoctoral research at the French National Scientific Research Center in July 1993.   

Dou returned to China in March 1995 and that year became associate professor at the University of Science and Technology of China, and was promoted to full professor in January 2000. He moved up the ranks to become assistant president in November 2003 and vice president in September 2005. He was honored as a Distinguished Young Scholar by the National Science Fund for Distinguished Young Scholars in 2010.

In December 2016, he was appointed president of Wuhan University, a position at vice-ministerial level.

Honours and awards
 27 November 2017 Member of the Chinese Academy of Sciences (CAS)

References

1966 births
Living people
People from Si County
Scientists from Anhui
Chinese physicists
University of Science and Technology of China alumni
Shanghai International Studies University alumni
Paris Diderot University alumni
Central Party School of the Chinese Communist Party alumni
Academic staff of the University of Science and Technology of China
Presidents of Wuhan University
People's Republic of China politicians from Anhui
Chinese Communist Party politicians from Anhui
Alternate members of the 20th Central Committee of the Chinese Communist Party
Members of the Chinese Academy of Sciences
Delegates to the 13th National People's Congress
Members of the 11th Chinese People's Political Consultative Conference